Reitan may refer to:

People
Jacob Reitan is an LGBT activist from Mankato, Minnesota who founded the Soulforce Equality Ride.
Haim Reitan (1946-) is a Turkish doctor, diplomat, translator and publicist.
Kirsten Reitan (born 29 September 1942) is a Norwegian politician for the Socialist Left Party.
Lorentz Reitan (born 1946) is a former director of the Bergen International Festival. 
Malin Reitan (1995-) is a Norwegian child singer.

Other
Reitan Group or Reitangruppen is a Norwegian wholesaler and retail franchiser.